The Speedway Grand Prix of Great Britain is a speedway event that is a part of the Speedway Grand Prix Series.

Winners

Most wins
 Jason Crump 5 times

References

See also

 
Great Britain